Hanna Andersson (1858-1938) was a Swedish member of The Salvation Army and sing- and psalm writer. She is known as the writer of psalms for The Salvation Army.

She was born in the country side, and moved to Stockholm in 1881. The Salvation Army was quite new when she became a member of it, and she belonged to the first members of it in Sweden when she joined it in 1883. She was the first woman in Sweden to be made officer The Salvation Army in Sweden.

She was active in Stockholm, Gothenburg, Visby, Malmö (1887), Karlstad (1887) and Eskilstuna (1891) between 1883 and her retirement in 1908. She was described as a powerful and energetic woman with a strong baryton voice, who accompanied her song by violin.

References 

1858 births
1938 deaths
Swedish Salvationists
19th-century Swedish singers
Swedish philanthropists
19th-century Swedish women musicians
19th-century Swedish musicians
Swedish violinists